The Politics of Abruzzo (Abruzzo, Italy) takes place in a framework of a presidential representative democracy, whereby the President of Regional Government is the head of government, and of a pluriform multi-party system. Executive power is exercised by the Regional Government. Legislative power is vested in both the government and the Regional Council.

Executive branch
The Regional Government (Giunta Regionale) is presided by the President of the Region (Presidente della Regione), who is elected for a five-year term, and is composed by the President and the Ministers (Assessori), who are currently 8, including a Vice President (Vicepresidente) and an undersecretary (Sottosegretario).

List of presidents

Legislative branch

The Regional Council of Abruzzo (Consiglio Regionale dell'Abruzzo) is composed of 40 members. 32 councillors are elected in provincial constituencies by proportional representation using the largest remainder method with a Droop quota and open lists, while 8 councillors (elected in bloc) come from a "regional list", including the President-elect. One seat is reserved for the candidate who comes second. If a coalition wins more than 50% of the total seats in the council with PR, only 4 candidates from the regional list will be chosen and the number of those elected in provincial constituencies will be 36. If the winning coalition receives less than 40% of votes, special seats are added to the council to ensure a large majority for the President's coalition.

The council is elected for a five-year term, but, if the President suffers a vote of no confidence, resigns or dies, under the simul stabunt, simul cadent clause introduced in 1999 (literally they will stand together or they will fall together), also the council is dissolved and a snap election is called.

Local government

Provinces

Municipalities

Provincial capitals

Parties and elections

Latest regional election

In the latest regional election, which took place on 10 February 2019, Marco Marsilio of Brothers of Italy was elected President of Abruzzo. The League, which fielded candidates for the first time in the region, was the largest party.

Notes

References

External links
Abruzzo Region
Regional Council of Abruzzo
Constitution of Abruzzo

 
Abruzzo